A bartender (also known as a barkeep or a mixologist) is a person who formulates and serves alcoholic or soft drink beverages behind the bar, usually in a licensed establishment as well as in restaurants and nightclubs, but also occasionally at private parties. Bartenders also usually maintain the supplies and inventory for the bar. As well as serving beer and wine, a bartender can generally also mix classic cocktails such as a Cosmopolitan, Manhattan, Old Fashioned, and Mojito.

Bartenders are also responsible for confirming that customers meet the legal drinking age requirements before serving them alcoholic beverages. In certain countries, such as the United States, Canada, the United Kingdom, Republic of Ireland and Sweden, bartenders are legally required to refuse more alcohol to drunk customers.

History

Historically, bartending was a profession with a low reputation. It was perceived through the lens of ethical issues and various legal constraints related to the serving of alcohol.

The pioneers of bartending as a serious profession appeared in the 19th century. Jerry Thomas established the image of the bartender as a creative professional. Harry Johnson wrote a bartending manual and established the first bar management consulting agency.

At the turn of the 20th century, slightly less than half the bartenders in London were women, such as Ada Coleman. "Barmaids", as they were called, were usually the daughters of tradesmen or mechanics or, occasionally, young women from the "better-born" classes who had been "thrown upon their own resources" and needed an income. Bartending has often been associated with the struggles of marginalized groups in the workforce, such as African-American women.

After the rise of the cocktail in the early 20th century, Americans were faced with prohibition laws from the Federal government. However, bartending culture remained alive throughout prohibition. Working in underground speakeasies, bartenders continued to provide their patrons with delicious cocktails. In fact, familiar cocktails, such as the gin and tonic, were invented during the Prohibition Era. Following the suspension of the eighteenth amendment and release of legal booze back into the market, the cocktail era unfortunately took a dip. People drank less and the Great Depression severely limited the ability of people to buy a drink. Cocktails started to be limited to the rich and famous. The celebrities in Los Angeles took a certain liking to the recipes of the old days. But the general population would no longer mix their drinks. Individualism was crushed similar to the food industry. The industry needed a renaissance and it wasn't until the late 90's that we saw the true re-emergence of the cocktail bar.

The bartending profession was generally a second occupation, used as transitional work for students to gain customer experience or to save money for university fees. The reason for this is because bartenders in tipping countries such as Canada and the United States, can make significant money from their tips. This view of bartending as a career is changing around the world, however, and bartending has become a profession by choice rather than necessity. It includes specialized education — European Bartender School operates in 25 countries.

Cocktail competitions such as World Class and Bacardi Legacy have recognized talented bartenders in the past decade and these bartenders, and others, spread the love of cocktails and hospitality throughout the world. Kathy Sullivan, owner of Sidecar Bartending, expressed the difficulties with becoming a prolific bartender, comparing the bartender to the drink they make:  “In drinks you want balance. And you have to be balanced physically, emotionally and mentally.”

A professional bartender should master the origin, physical characteristics, taste characteristics, production technology and drinking method of various alcohols, and be able to identify the quality and year of the liquor. In addition, the bartender also needs to give reasonable recommendations on what kind of drink the guests need to match with different foods. Finally, because cocktails are made up of a base liquor paired with different materials, understanding the physical and chemical effects of base liquor and different materials, and thus the taste differences, is the basis for bartenders to create new drinks.

By country

United Kingdom
In the United Kingdom, bar work is often not regarded as a long-term profession (unless the bartender is also the landlord), but more often as a second occupation, or transitional work for students to gain customer experience or to save money for university fees. It therefore lacks traditional employment protections, so there is often a high turnover. The high turnover of staff due to low wages and poor employee benefits results in a shortage of skilled bartenders. Whereas a career bartender would know drink recipes, serving techniques, alcohol contents, correct gas mixes and licensing law and would often have cordial relations with regular customers, short-term staff may lack these skills. Some pubs prefer experienced staff, although pub chains tend to accept inexperienced staff and provide training.

Tipping bartenders in the United Kingdom is uncommon, not considered mandatory but is greatly appreciated by the bartender. The appropriate way to tip a bartender in the UK is to say 'have one for yourself', encouraging the bartender to buy themselves a drink with one's money, where a bartender may instead opt to add a modest amount to a bill to take in cash at the end of their shift.

United States

The Bureau of Labor Statistics data on occupations in the United States, including that of bartender, publishes a detailed description of the bartender's typical duties and employment and earning statistics by those so employed, with 55% of a bartender's take-home pay coming in the form of tips. The hourly wage a bartender receives can vary depending on the state.  The federal Fair Labor Standards Act (FLSA), and the laws of most states, allow employers a tip credit, which counts employees tips toward minimum wage. As of September 26, 2020, the federal minimum wage rate is $7.25/hour.

As a result of the professionalization of the trade, craft bartenders have begun to establish themselves as the elite class of the bartending profession. "Craft" cocktails are curated drinks using high-quality ingredients, generally accompanied by a higher price as well. Craft bartenders typically operate in more upscale venues, such as hotel bars. They make the majority of their income in tips from higher-class customers.

Bartenders in the United States may work in a large variety of bars. These include hotel bars, restaurant bars, sports bars, gay bars, piano bars, and dive bars. Also growing in popularity is the portable bar, which can be moved to different venues and special events.

Hospitality bartenders make up 77% of the membership of the United States Bartender's Guild. As a result, the union lobbies for higher tips with lower base wages. Lower-class bartenders generally do not participate in the union, since their customers may not tip or may not be able to afford to.

The bartender culture in the United States encourages bartenders to be inviting and friendly to their patrons. Their customers' needs and wants become their priority, as well as their safety and enjoyment of their time at the bar. Bartenders are urged to take care of their patrons however they can.

Bartenders may attend special schools or learn while on the job. Bartenders in the United States usually have on-the-job training, from the owners, management, or other superior staff with experience. Prospective bartenders may gain experience by working as wait staff in a restaurant with a bar. Some vocational schools offer bartenders licenses.  Some US states require a bartenders license or a health certificate issued from the state.

Most pubs and bars seek to recruit outgoing, personable individuals as bartenders. All bartenders must comply with all food and beverage regulations, in the United States. All bartenders in the United States should be knowledgeable in mixing, garnishing, and serving drinks with a positive attitude and excellent communication skills. The competition for jobs is high in this field of work.

Japan

The Japanese way of bartending is like "a time-capsule of 1930s international bartending," cocktail historian David Wondrich said. The Japanese cut-glass mixing beaker is in almost universal use nowadays. Japanese bar-tools are also all widely used. The world has been mesmerised by the art and style of Japanese bartending. Japanese law generally requires food and drink to be served under (or in conjunction with) the supervision of a food hygiene supervisor, and this also applies to bartenders. Nippon Bartenders' Association (N.B.A.) is an industry association for bartenders. It is an exam organized by the target is people over the age of 20 who work as a bartender in the restaurant industry. It is a subject exam on liquor and cocktails from the N.B.A. Official Cocktail Book. N.B.A. certification can also take exams other than members, but N.B.A. membership exam fees will be cheaper.  Since the basic knowledge as a bartender is measured, it can be said that it is a suitable qualification for young people who study cocktails every day while working in the field to measure the results of their efforts.

China 
In China, with the prosperity of the bar industry, bartenders have gradually become a popular profession. Professional bartenders need to obtain the certification of the National Labor Department's vocational technical ability appraisement. Those who pass the exam will be issued a corresponding level of skill certificate by the China vocational education qualification certification center, which is a compliance certificate for relevant personnel's job hunting, appointment, promotion, etc. , the certificate is valid nationwide. In China, tens of thousands of people have obtained the "Bartender Qualification Certificate" issued by the Ministry of Labor and Social Protection units. With the great increase in the number of cocktail bars, as the pillar of the bar, the salary structure of the bartender includes the basic salary + service charge + drink commission. Any kind of bartending method requires basic bartending knowledge. Junior bartenders are required to master the varieties and formulas of 20 kinds of cocktails, and the training time is 40 hours; intermediate bartenders are required to master the varieties and formulas of 40 kinds of cocktails, and the training time is 60 credit hours; senior bartenders are not only required to master the varieties and recipes of hundreds of cocktails, but also focus on creating their own cocktails and managing bars.

Canada 

Bartenders can be found in many establishments across Canada, they may appear in nightclubs, restaurants, bars, hotels and even airports in cities. Although Canada does not have a national-wide bartender certification, instead, people must apply for a new provincial certification in each province they want to bartend. Some provinces do not require certification, such as in Saskatchewan, Labrador, Quebec, Newfoundland, Nova Scotia and New Brunswick, there’s no legally mandatory certification to serve alcohol, but certain document for serving alcoholic beverages that are marked as “recommended” in the province, and employers have a right to ask their bartenders to have them.

As social attitudes toward legal responsibility change, more and more provinces are requiring certification for responsible alcohol sales of bartenders, managers and even event and liquor store employees. The provinces that require bartender certification are Ontario, Alberta, Manitoba, Prince Edward Island and British Columbia. All of these certifications come with a card or certificate, if the province where the bartender is located is mandatory for the bartender certification, health and safety inspectors may ask to see a bartender's certifications when inspecting his workplace.

See also

References

External links

{{Bartender Jobs in USA}}

Food services occupations
Restaurant terminology